The Japanese waxwing (Bombycilla japonica) is a fairly small passerine bird of the waxwing family found in the East Palaearctic. It feeds mainly on fruit and berries but also eats insects during the summer. The nest is a cup of twigs lined with grass and moss which is built in a tree.

Description
The Japanese waxwing is about 18 cm in length and its plumage is mostly pinkish-brown. 
The Japanese waxwing has a pointed crest, a black throat, a black stripe through the eye, a pale yellow centre to the belly and a black tail with a red tip. The wings have a pattern of black, grey and white with a reddish-brown stripe running across them. Its call is a high-pitched trill but there is no true song.

Unlike the other species of waxwing, it lacks the row of waxy red feather-tips on the wing which gives the birds their name. Japanese waxwings often occur in mixed flocks with Bohemian waxwings which, as well as having the row of waxy tips, are slightly larger with a yellow tail-tip, greyish centre to the belly and no reddish-brown stripe across the wing.

Distribution and habitat

The Japanese waxwing breeds in coniferous forests in the Russian Far East and in Heilongjiang province, north-east China. It is at some risk of becoming threatened with extinction due to loss and degradation of its forest habitat.

It winters in Japan, Korea and eastern China; the exact distribution is irregular as flocks move in search of berries and birds may be common in an area one year and scarce the next. In Japan it is present from November to April; few birds winter on Hokkaidō but in south-western Japan, it outnumbers the Bohemian waxwing. The winter habitat is open woodland or farmland in the lowlands or low mountains and birds frequently visit berry-laden trees in parks and gardens.

Vagrant birds appear in Hong Kong, central China and Taiwan but records from Europe are more likely to be escapes from captivity than genuinely wild birds.

References

Mark A. Brazil (1991) The Birds of Japan, Christopher Helm, London
John MacKinnon & Karen Phillipps (2000) A Field Guide to the Birds of China, Oxford University Press, Oxford

External links
Internet Bird Collection, Video of Japanese waxwing

Japanese waxwing
Birds of Japan
Birds of Manchuria
Japanese waxwing